Joe Fletcher (born September 10, 1976) is a Canadian former soccer referee from Niagara Falls, Ontario. He is currently the manager of senior assistant referees for the Professional Referee Organization.

Fletcher is also known in accounting circles as a Chartered Professional Accountant who had his designation revoked by CPA Canada in 2020. Fletcher was disciplined for improperly taking $14.2 million in loans from his clients and falsifying documents to cover up his misconduct.

Career 
Fletcher initially began officiating in 1999 in the Canadian Professional Soccer League, after receiving the opportunity from Tony Camacho then the CPSL Director of Officials. 

When the 2007 FIFA U-20 World Cup was held that summer in Canada, he was selected to be one of the tournament's assistant referees. In 2007, he officiated the 2007 Open Canada Cup finals match. He was also voted the CSL Referee of the Year in 2007. In 2012, the Canadian Soccer Association (CSA) selected Fletcher as the recipient for the Ray Morgan Memorial Award, and the Canada Soccer International Achievement Award in 2015.

In 2018, he was voted MLS assistant referee of the year. On January 18, 2019, he retired from officiating and served as a referee instructor for the CSA. In January 2020, he was named the manager of senior assistant referees for the Professional Referee Organization (PRO).

Outside of soccer, Fletcher was a CPA. In 2020, Fletcher was suspended by the Chartered Professional Accountants of Ontario for misconduct, after having been found to have improperly borrowed money from clients and falsified audits to hide the trail.

World Cup 

He was selected as an assistant referee for the 2014 FIFA World Cup.

In 2018, Fletcher was selected to be an assistant referee at the 2018 FIFA World Cup in Russia, his second World Cup appointment. He was an assistant video assistant referee for the Argentina vs Iceland and  Uruguay vs Portugal games. He was also an assistant referee for the Portugal vs Morocco, South Korea vs Germany and the knockout stage match Colombia vs England.

References

https://www.cpaontario.ca/protecting-the-public/hearings-appeals/cases/d-19-009

External links

1976 births
Living people
Sportspeople from Niagara Falls, Ontario
Canadian soccer referees
Canadian accountants
Black Canadian sportspeople
Major League Soccer referees
CONCACAF Gold Cup referees
Olympic football referees
Football referees at the 2012 Summer Olympics
2014 FIFA World Cup referees
Brock University alumni
2018 FIFA World Cup referees